Brunia dorsalis is a species of moth of the family Erebidae. It was described by Francis Walker in 1866. It is found in the Northern Territory, Queensland, the Sula Islands, the Louisiade Archipelago and New Guinea.

References

Moths described in 1866
Lithosiina